Alfred Francini (born 23 May 1903, date of death unknown) was an Italian racing cyclist. He rode in the 1925 Tour de France.

References

1903 births
Year of death missing
Italian male cyclists
Place of birth missing